Mount Raiden Volcanic Group is a volcanic group of active stratovolcanoes and lava domes situated in Hokkaidō, Japan. The volcanoes were active 1.4 million to 800,000 years ago.

List of peaks

References
 

Volcanoes of Hokkaido
Volcanism of Japan
Volcanic groups